The Suppression of Religious Houses Act 1539 (31 Hen 8 c 13), sometimes referred to as the Second Act of Dissolution or as the Act for the Dissolution of the Greater Monasteries, was an Act of the Parliament of England.

It provided for the dissolution of 552 monasteries and houses remaining after the Dissolution of the Lesser Monasteries Act of 1535.

The whole Act, except section 19, was repealed by section 1 of, and Part II of the Schedule to, the Statute Law (Repeals) Act 1969.

Section 19 was repealed by section 1(1) of, and Part VIII of Schedule 1 to, the Statute Law (Repeals) Act 1989. The Law Commission and Scottish Law Commission had advised that section 19 was "spent".

See also
Dissolution of the Monasteries
Suppression of Religious Houses Act 1535

References
Halsbury's Statutes
The Statutes Revised. Third Edition. HMSO. 1950. Volume I. Pages 199 to 212. 

Acts of the Parliament of England concerning religion
1539 in law
1539 in England
Christianity and law in the 16th century
1539 in Christianity